All About Them (French title: À trois on y va) is a 2015 French romantic comedy film directed by Jérôme Bonnell. It stars Anaïs Demoustier, Félix Moati and Sophie Verbeeck.

Plot 
Micha and Charlotte are a couple who have recently bought a house near Lille. For the past few months, the two slowly drift apart and Charlotte starts cheating on Micha with their mutual friend Mélodie who works as a lawyer. Little does Charlotte know, Micha also starts cheating on her with the same person, Mélodie. Mélodie ends up falling in love with both of them while she becomes the secret lover of both Micha and Charlotte.

Cast 
 Anaïs Demoustier as Mélodie 
 Félix Moati as Micha 
 Sophie Verbeeck as Charlotte 
 Patrick d'Assumçao as William 
 Caroline Baehr as Aunt Estelle
 Claire Magnin as Lawyer Courtois  
 Olivier Broche as The depressive 
 Laure Calamy as The aggressive

Accolades

References

External links 
 

2015 films
2015 romantic comedy films
2010s French-language films
French romantic comedy films
2015 LGBT-related films
French LGBT-related films
Lesbian-related films
Belgian LGBT-related films
LGBT-related romantic comedy films
Belgian romantic comedy films
Films set in Lille
2010s French films